Cats and Dogs (Italian: Cani e gatti)  is a 1952 Italian comedy film directed by Leonardo De Mitri and starring Titina De Filippo, Umberto Spadaro and Antonella Lualdi. The film's sets were designed by the art director Franco Lolli.

Plot
In a village, the pharmacist and the innkeeper have an intense rivalry fuelled by the fact that they were once romantically involved many years before. To spite her rival, the innkeeper arranges to have her nephew set up a second pharmacy to take business away him. Unbeknownst to them a romance is developing between the younger generation of the families.

Cast
Titina De Filippo  as Donna Elvira 
Umberto Spadaro   as  Don Filippo  
Antonella Lualdi   as  Lia  
Armando Francioli   as  Sandro  
 Paolo Stoppa  as Don Cosimo 
Carlo Romano  as  Don Saverio  
Marisa Merlini   as  Donna Filomena  
Carlo Sposito   as   Tonino 
Gianni Cavalieri   as  Don Michele  
 Pietro Carloni as Cav. Anselmi 
 Silvio Bagolini

References

External links

1952 films
1950s Italian-language films
Italian comedy films
1952 comedy films
Italian black-and-white films
1950s Italian films
Films directed by Leonardo De Mitri